Digital notary may refer to

 an eNotary, a notary or notary public who is able to perform notarial acts electronically.
 Trusted timestamping, an electronic method to create permanent evidence that a document or other electronic information existed in a certain form at a particular point in time.